Ridgway's rough-winged swallow (Stelgidopteryx serripennis ridgwayi) is a  bird in the family Hirundinidae.
It is found in Belize, Guatemala, and Mexico.  Most taxonomic authorities consider it to be a subspecies of the northern rough-winged swallow.

Its common name and Latin binomial commemorate American ornithologist Robert Ridgway.

References
 BirdLife International 2004.  Stelgidopteryx ridgwayi.   2006 IUCN Red List of Threatened Species.  Downloaded on 27 July 2007.

Ridgway's rough-winged swallow
Birds of Belize
Birds of Guatemala
Ridgway's rough-winged swallow
Taxonomy articles created by Polbot
Subspecies